The men's 110 metres hurdles event at the 2014 Asian Games was held at the Incheon Asiad Main Stadium, Incheon, South Korea on 28–30 September.

Schedule
All times are Korea Standard Time (UTC+09:00)

Records

Results
Legend
DNF — Did not finish

Round 1
 Qualification: First 3 in each heat (Q) and the next 2 fastest (q) advance to the final.

Heat 1 
 Wind: +1.0 m/s

Heat 2 
 Wind: +0.7 m/s

Final
 Wind: +0.4 m/s

References

results

Hurdles 110
2014 men